Menucha Publishers is an Orthodox Jewish English-language publishing company based in Brooklyn, New York. Originally founded as a distributor for Targum Press, in 2011 after Targum's shutdown, Menucha established itself as an independent publishing company while continuing to distribute original Targum titles. Subsequently, they began reprinting Targum books in a more modern style.

In the 1990s books were published using "Targum/Feldheim" on the back cover and (using a backslash) "Targum\Feldheim" on the inside title page. Targum Press was the publisher and Feldheim Publishers the distributor.

History

Targum (1984-2008)
Targum Press was founded in 1984 by the late Rabbi Moshe Dombey, at the time a lecturer at yeshiva Ohr Somayach and Neve Yerushalayim seminary. Since its inception, Targum relied on Feldheim Publishers as its distributor; however, it proved too costly.

Targum/Menucha (2008-2011)
In 2008, they turned to Menucha Publishers, owned by Hirsch Meir Traub, to run all of the American distribution.

Targum (2011-present)
In 2011, Targum, which had been struggling financially, shut down, while Menucha still had all their distribution inventory (however, Targum was reopened soon after by Akiva Atwood). They were therefore able to continue operations, buying books directly from Targum's original printer.

TargumPress.com in 2022 redirected to TargumPublishers.com, saying "35 years of the Finest Jewish Books."

Menucha (2011-present)
Menucha was able to work with authors – some new and some that had previously published with Targum – to publish books with them. 

The MenuchaPublishers website has a shopping cart app.

Companies
Menucha Classroom Solutions (MCS) was created by Menucha Publishers in 2017 "to raise literary standards and enhance every ELA classroom by providing appropriate literature and educational material to classrooms around the globe". MCS selects books excluding those with violence, immodesty, abuse, or foul language. Secular books are rated on a scale of one to four, considerations being references to non-Jewish holidays, Christianity, internet and television, and language considered improper according to some standards. A

Another product of Menucha Publishers, the Jewish Book Box delivers a box of 2-5 books to subscribers' doors monthly. The boxes include both secular and Jewish titles.

References

Orthodox Jewish publishing companies
Jewish printing and publishing
Jewish literature
Book publishing companies based in New York City
Publishing companies established in 2008
Haredi media
Mass media companies based in New York City